Machete Savane may refer to the following snake:
Long-tailed Machete Savane or Chironius multiventris, a colubrid snake
Smooth Machete Savane or Chironius scurrulus, a colubrid snake
Chironius carinatus, also known as machete savane
Leptodeira annulata, also known as machete savane